Motor Traction Limited manufactured Rutland motor lorries at Rutland Works, Vulcan Way, New Addington Surrey. The lorries — capacities between 3 tons and 15 tons — and passenger chassis were built to an operator's specific requirements using the major components of other manufacturers. They first exhibited at the 1956 Commercial Motor Show.

The business operated from 1951 to 1958, at first from Croydon proper. An earlier name for the business was Waggon Rutland Limited. Vehicles were often marked M. T. N.

The shareholders chose to liquidate the company in 1958.

References

Defunct companies based in Surrey
Motor vehicle manufacturers based in London
Vehicle manufacturing companies established in 1951
Defunct motor vehicle manufacturers of England
Defunct bus manufacturers of the United Kingdom
Defunct truck manufacturers of the United Kingdom
Vehicle manufacturing companies disestablished in 1958
1951 establishments in England
1958 disestablishments in England